The English Rose is a 1920 British silent drama film directed by Fred Paul and starring Humberston Wright.

Cast
 Fred Paul as Father Michael  
 Humberston Wright as Captain MacDonnell  
 Sydney Folker as Harry O'Malley  
 Mary Morton 
 Jack Raymond 
 Amy Brandon Thomas 
 George Turner 
 Clifford Desborough

References

Bibliography
 Low, Rachael. History of the British Film, 1918-1929. George Allen & Unwin, 1971.

External links
 

1920 films
1920 drama films
British drama films
British silent feature films
Films directed by Fred Paul
British black-and-white films
1920s English-language films
1920s British films
Silent drama films